Concordia Senior College was a liberal arts college located in Fort Wayne, Indiana, and affiliated with the Lutheran Church–Missouri Synod (LCMS). It was founded in 1957 and closed in 1977.

The senior college was a new type of institution for the LCMS. It provided future pastors with training before they attended a seminary, during their third and fourth undergraduate years of college. Concordia Senior College was by-and-large an all-men's institution with no female faculty, although there were a small number of female students who were housed in a separate dormitory.

In 1977, the function of Concordia Senior College was transferred to other LCMS colleges, the Concordia University System. Today those colleges are responsible for much of the undergraduate training of future LCMS pastors. The campus became the home of the Concordia Theological Seminary as that institution relocated from Springfield, Illinois.

Athletics 
The Concorida Senior College's athletic teams were called the Cadets. The college was a member of the National Association of Intercollegiate Athletics (NAIA), primarily competing in the Mid-Central College Conference (MCCC; now currently known as the Crossroads League since the 2012–13 school year) from 1959–60 to 1971–72, and then as an independent until the school's closure.

Notable people 
 David Benke - Lutheran pastor and the former president of the Atlantic District of the LCMS
 Clifford Flanigan - American professor of English, medievalist, and theatre historian
 Alan Harre - eighteenth president of Valparaiso University
 Joel D. Heck - professor of theology at Concordia University Texas
 Ralph W. Klein - American Old Testament scholar
 Robert Kolb - professor emeritus of Systematic Theology at Concordia Seminary,
 James F. Laatsch - former member of the Wisconsin State Assembly
 Donald K. Muchow - former rear admiral and Chief of Chaplains of the United States Navy
 Richard Pervo - American biblical scholar
 Norbert Schedler - faculty member (associate professor, 1963-1967; chair of the Department of Philosophy, 1968-1969)
 Paul W. Schroeder - American historian
 Ronald Frank Thiemann - American political theologian

External links 
Saarinen's Village: The Concordia Campus Through Time

Eero Saarinen structures
Educational institutions established in 1957
Defunct private universities and colleges in Indiana
Education in Fort Wayne, Indiana
Universities and colleges affiliated with the Lutheran Church–Missouri Synod
Buildings and structures in Fort Wayne, Indiana
Educational institutions disestablished in 1977
1957 establishments in Indiana
1977 disestablishments in Indiana
Lutheranism in Indiana